Michal Kempný (born 8 September 1990) is a Czech professional ice hockey defenceman who is currently playing with HC Sparta Praha in the Czech Extraliga (ELH). Kempný formerly played in the National Hockey League (NHL) and won the Stanley Cup as a member of the Washington Capitals in 2018.

Playing career
Kempný played as a youth in Czech Republic with HC Dyje Břeclav and made his professional debut in the Slovak Extraliga with HK 36 Skalica.

Moving to play more competitively, Kempný played for HC Kometa Brno of the Czech Extraliga.

After seven seasons of professional hockey in the ELH, Kempný was signed by Russian club, Avangard Omsk, to play in the Kontinental Hockey League on 29 April 2015. In the 2015–16 season, he quickly transitioned to become the club's top defenseman, scoring 21 points in 59 games from the blueline.

Upon competing in his first senior international tournament for the Czech Republic at the 2016 IIHF World Championships, on 23 May 2016, Kempný as an undrafted free agent was signed to a one-year contract with the Chicago Blackhawks of the NHL. Kempný made his NHL debut on 12 October. He scored the first goal of his NHL career on 30 December against Cam Ward of the Carolina Hurricanes.

In his first season with the club, he recorded 8 points in 50 games. On 27 May 2017, Kempný, who was set to become a restricted free agent, was re-signed by the club to a one-year extension.

On 19 February 2018, Kempný was traded to the Washington Capitals in exchange for the higher of Toronto or Washington's own third-round pick in the 2018 NHL Entry Draft; the pick would later be dealt and ultimately resulted in the selection of Linus Karlsson by the San Jose Sharks. Kempný scored his first career playoff goal in Game 1 of the 2018 Eastern Conference Finals against the Tampa Bay Lightning on a wrist shot from the point. He won the Stanley Cup with the Washington Capitals on June 7, 2018, and subsequently signed a four-year, $10 million extension with Washington.

While training for 2020–21 season, Kempný tore his Achilles tendon. On 7 October 2020, the Washington Capitals announced that the defenseman had surgery to repair his injury. In consequence, Kempný's season was limited to only two games for Capitals' AHL affiliate team, Hershey Bears.

On 27 December 2021, the Capitals recalled him back to active duty after they lost six players due to the league's coronavirus protocols, including three of their top six defensemen.  On 29 December 2021, Kempný had an assist in his first regular-season NHL appearance in almost two years.

As a free agent from the Capitals, following five seasons within the organization, Kempný joined his third NHL club after he was signed to a one-year, $750,000 contract with the Seattle Kraken on 24 July 2022. Unable to make the Kraken out of training camp, Kempný was placed on waivers and re-assigned to AHL affiliate, Coachella Valley Firebirds to begin the 2022–23 season. He made two appearances with the Firebirds before he was placed on unconditional waivers by the Kraken in order to mutually terminate his contract on 20 October 2022. 

Having returned to the Czech Republic, Kempný returning to the Extraliga for the first time since 2015, agreeing to a two-year contract with HC Sparta Praha, on 25 October 2022.

Career statistics

Regular season and playoffs

International

Awards and honours

References

External links

 
 

1990 births
Living people
Avangard Omsk players
Chicago Blackhawks players
Coachella Valley Firebirds players
Czech ice hockey defencemen
BK Havlíčkův Brod players
Hershey Bears players
SHK Hodonín players
HC Kometa Brno players
People from Hodonín
Sportspeople from the South Moravian Region
HK 36 Skalica players
HC Slavia Praha players
HC Sparta Praha players
SK Horácká Slavia Třebíč players
Stanley Cup champions
Undrafted National Hockey League players
Washington Capitals players
Czech expatriate ice hockey players in Russia
Czech expatriate ice hockey players in the United States